Maritza Poncio (born 3 December 1994) is a female racewalker from Guatemala. She competed in the Women's 20 kilometres walk event at the 2015 World Championships in Athletics in Beijing, China.

See also
 Guatemala at the 2015 World Championships in Athletics

References

1994 births
Living people
Place of birth missing (living people)
Guatemalan female racewalkers
World Athletics Championships athletes for Guatemala
Athletes (track and field) at the 2016 Summer Olympics
Olympic athletes of Guatemala
Central American Games bronze medalists for Guatemala
Central American Games medalists in athletics
Athletes (track and field) at the 2019 Pan American Games
Pan American Games competitors for Guatemala